Baeoctenus is a genus of European non-biting midges in the subfamily Orthocladiinae of the bloodworm family

Species
B. bicolor Sæther, 1976

References

Chironomidae
Nematocera genera